Robert Ernest Simanek (26 April 1930 – 1 August 2022) was a United States Marine and a recipient of the United States military's highest decoration, the Medal of Honor, for his actions during the Korean War.

Early life
Simanek was born in Detroit, Michigan, on 26 April 1930.  He graduated from high school there in 1948 and worked for the Ford Motor Company and General Motors, before joining the United States Marine Corps on 13 August 1951.

Marine Corps
Completing recruit training at Marine Corps Recruit Depot Parris Island, South Carolina, in October 1951, Simanek was ordered to Camp Pendleton, California, the following month. After further training at Camp Pendleton, he sailed for Korea in April 1952, joining Company F, 2nd Battalion, 5th Marines on 6 May. He had earned two battle stars by the time of his Medal of Honor action.

Simanek was serving with Company F, 2nd Battalion, 5th Marines, 1st Marine Division, when the action occurred on 18 August 1952, during the Battle of Bunker Hill. His patrol had gone well forward of friendly lines to occupy an outpost when the Marines ran into a trap. He threw himself on an enemy grenade to save his comrades, and was severely wounded in the legs.

Simanek received medical treatment aboard the hospital ship  and in Japan before being returned to the United States in September 1952. He then was hospitalized at Mare Island, California, and at Naval Station Great Lakes, Illinois, until he was placed on the temporary disability retired list, 1 March 1953.

The Medal of Honor was presented to him by President Dwight D. Eisenhower in a White House ceremony on 27 October 1953. He was the 36th Marine to receive the medal in the Korean War.

In addition to the Medal of Honor, Simanek was also awarded the Purple Heart, the Korean Service Medal with two bronze service stars, the United Nations Service Medal, and the National Defense Service Medal.

Personal life
Simanek married Nancy Middleton in 1956.  They remained married until her death in 2020.  Together, they had one child, Ann.

After retiring from the military, Simanek obtained a degree in business management from Wayne State University.  He was then employed in the auto industry and by the Small Business Administration.  Simanek died on 1 August 2022, in Novi, Michigan.  He was 92 years old.

His death leaves only 65 living recipients of the Medal of Honor.

Awards and honors

Medal of Honor citation
Simanek's official Medal of Honor citation reads:

On 15 January 2021 the Secretary of the Navy announced that the Expeditionary Sea Base ESB-7 would be named .

See also

List of Korean War Medal of Honor recipients

References

External links
Phalen, Lane. "Three Who Acted" , AMVETS Magazine, 2002. Retrieved 2006-06-23

1930 births
2022 deaths
United States Marines
United States Marine Corps personnel of the Korean War
United States Marine Corps Medal of Honor recipients
Korean War recipients of the Medal of Honor
Military personnel from Detroit
American people of Czech descent
American people of the Korean War
Wayne State University alumni